Koeru is a small borough in Järva Parish, Järva County in northern-central Estonia. As of 2011 Census, the settlement's population was 1,178.

The tallest structure in Estonia, Koeru TV Mast, is located near Koeru in Kapu village.

Notable people
Aino Bach (1901–1980), artist 
Gert Kams (born 1985), football player
Kalju Lepik (1920–1999), poet
Karl Selter (1898–1958), politician
Lembit Ulfsak (1947–2017), actor

References

External links

Boroughs and small boroughs in Estonia
Kreis Jerwen